Partula clara is a species of air-breathing land snail, a terrestrial pulmonate gastropod mollusk in the family Partulidae. This species is endemic to Tahiti, French Polynesia.

References

External links

Fauna of French Polynesia
Partula (gastropod)
Taxa named by William Harper Pease
Taxonomy articles created by Polbot
Gastropods described in 1864